Yousra Saouf (born 29 April 1992) is a Moroccan singer who rose to fame in the Arab world at the age of 20 following her participation in the second season of Arab Idol, broadcast on MBC. She was acclaimed by the jury and the public, her voice being linked to the Egyptian diva Najat Essaghira. She was ranked ninth in the competition.

Early life
Yousra Saouf is from Casablanca, Morocco.

Performances in Arab Idol

Performances during the auditions
 Casting (Casablanca): "Akthar Min Awal Ahebak" by Ahlam
 Casting Beirut (Group audition): "Mali" by Warda Al-Jazairia
 Casting Beirut (Finale audition): "Ana Fintizarak" by Umm Kulthum

Performances during the primes
 Top 27: "Oyoun El Alb" by Najat Essaghira
 Wildcards Survival Prime: "Ma Thasabnish" by Sherine
 1st Prime: "El Amaken" by Mohammed Abdu
 2nd Prime: "Elli Kan" by Nancy Ajram
 3rd Prime: "In Raht Minek Ya Ain" by Shadia
 4th Prime: "Ana Albi Lek Meyal" by Fayza Ahmed

After Arab Idol
After leaving the program, Yousra was contacted by the Emirati lyricist Mosaab El Anzi, who, charmed by her voice, wrote her first song "Bghito Yahlali". The song, written in Moroccan Arabic, will be included in an upcoming debut album. Yousra shared the stage with Ahlam during her concert on 30 May 2013 at the Mawazine music festival in Rabat, Morocco. She sang "Akthar Min Awal Ahebak" and "Ma Isah Illa Sahih".

References

1992 births
People from Casablanca
21st-century Moroccan women singers
Living people
Contestants from Arabic singing competitions